The 2008 Summit League men's basketball tournament was won by Oral Roberts.  It took place March 8–11, 2008 at the Union Multipurpose Activity Center in Tulsa, Oklahoma.

All-tournament team
 Jaraun Burrows, IPFW
 Moses Ehambe, Oral Roberts (Most Valuable Player)
 George Hill, IUPUI
 Robert Jarvis, Oral Roberts
 Derick Nelson, Oakland

Format
The top eight eligible men's basketball teams in the Summit League receive a berth in the conference tournament. After the 18 game conference season, teams are seeded by conference record with the following tie-breakers:
 Head-to-head competition
 Winning percentage vs. ranked conference teams (starting with #1 and moving down until the tie is broken)
 Ratings Percentage Index
 Coin flip

2008 seeds

x-Clinched regular season championship

NOTE: North Dakota State and South Dakota State are ineligible for the 2008 Tournament.

4th Place Tiebreaker
IPFW and Southern Utah split their two games and had identical records against each conference team. Southern Utah received the 4th seed, because their RPI of 231 was better than IPFW's RPI of 235.

Bracket

References

External links
Summit League men's basketball

2007–08 Summit League men's basketball season
Summit League men's basketball tournament
Basketball competitions in Tulsa, Oklahoma
The Summit League men's basketball tournament
College sports tournaments in Oklahoma